In psychoanalysis, a Freudian slip, also called parapraxis, is an error in speech, memory, or physical action that occurs due to the interference of an unconscious subdued wish or internal train of thought. Classical examples involve slips of the tongue, but psychoanalytic theory also embraces misreadings, mishearings, mistypings, temporary forgettings, and the mislaying and losing of objects.

History

Origin and development 
The Freudian slip is named after Sigmund Freud, who, in his 1901 book The Psychopathology of Everyday Life, described and analyzed a large number of seemingly trivial, even bizarre, or nonsensical errors and slips, most notably the Signorelli parapraxis.

Freud's process of psychoanalysis is often described as being lengthy and complex, as was the case with many of the dreams in his 1899 book The Interpretation of Dreams. An obstacle that faces the non-German-speaking reader is such that in original German, The Interpretation of Dreams, Freud's emphasis on "slips of the tongue" leads to the inclusion of a great deal of colloquial and informal material that are extremely resistant to translations.

As in the study of dreams, Freud submits his discussion with the intention of demonstrating the existence of unconscious mental processes in the healthy:

Research and studies 

A 1979 study investigated Freudian slips by having male test participants who had been primed with a stimulus either related to sex or an electric shock to read a list of words that had meaningful spoonerisms related to both stimuli. Primed participants had a far higher rate of spoonerism related to the specific stimulus.

Alternative explanations

In contrast to psychoanalytic theorists, cognitive psychologists say that linguistic slips can represent a sequencing conflict in grammar production. From this perspective, slips may be due to cognitive underspecification that can take a variety of forms – inattention, incomplete sense data or insufficient knowledge. Secondly, they may be due to the existence of some locally appropriate response pattern that is strongly primed by its prior usage, recent activation or emotional change or by the situation calling conditions.

Some sentences are just susceptible to the process of banalisation: the replacement of archaic or unusual expressions with forms that are in more common use. In other words, the errors were due to strong habit substitution.

Slips of the tongue 
In general use, the term 'Freudian slip' has been debased to refer to any accidental slips of the tongue. Thus many examples are found in explanations and dictionaries which do not strictly fit the psychoanalytic definition.

For example: She: 'What would you like—bread and butter, or cake?' He: 'Bed and butter.'

In the above, the man may be presumed to have a sexual feeling or intention that he wished to leave unexpressed, not a sexual feeling or intention that was dynamically repressed. His sexual intention was therefore secret, rather than subconscious, and any 'parapraxis' would inhere in the idea that he unconsciously wished to express that intention, rather than in the sexual connotation of the substitution. Freudians might point out, however, that this is simply a description of what Freud and Breuer termed the preconscious which Freud defined as thoughts that are not presently conscious but can become conscious without meeting any resistance. In Freud's theory, he allows parapraxes to be generated in the preconscious, so he would allow for thoughts that one tries to put outside of consciousness to have effects on conscious actions.

Human-computer interaction 
Beyond slips of the tongue, these accidental human errors also commonly occur in the realm of human-computer interaction. In the context of interaction design, slips refer to an incorrect action that is taken with the correct intention. As opposed to mistakes, which refer to an incorrect action due to an incorrect intention, slips result from automatic behaviors that are triggered by external factors, distracting the user from carrying out their intended goal. There are many different types of slips in interaction design, including capture errors, description similarity slips, data-driven errors, associative activation, loss of activation, and mode errors.

Capture errors occur when a familiar behavior takes over a less frequently occurring behavior. An example of a capture error would be driving to the office on a Saturday when the intention was to go to the grocery store.

Description similarity slips occur when an action is taken upon an item that is similar to the one you intended. For example, flipping the switch for the bathroom vent fan instead of the light switch to turn on the bathroom light would be a description similarity slip.

Data-driven errors occur in the arrival of new sensory information that triggers an automatic response, such as dialing the hotel concierge to reserve a particular room and dialing the room number instead.

Associative activation errors are caused by an internal correlation of two actions. For example, associating the phone ringing with someone knocking on the door and saying "come in" as a response would represent a type of associative activation error. Associative activation errors are also considered accidental slips of the tongue.

Loss of activation is the error of executing an action but forgetting the goal behind the intended action. A common example of a loss of activation error is walking into a room and forgetting the purpose for walking into the room.

Lastly, mode errors occur when the input for an action is the same for different modes of operation, but the output of that action varies according to the selected mode. These errors could easily occur with the gear shift control in cars, since the action of stepping on the gas pedal to execute the action is the same for all gears, but the direction in which the car moves depends on the selected gear. This could lead to detrimental consequences if a user was accidentally in reverse mode but intended to be in drive mode.

See also

References

Sources
 Bloom, J. (2007, October). Lecture. Presented at New School University, New York, New York.
 Baars et al. (1992). Some caveats on testing the Freudian Slip Hypothesis, Experimental Slips and Human Error: Exploring the Architecture of Volition.
 Freud, Sigmund. (1991 [1915]) Introductory Lectures on Psychoanalysis. Penguin Books Ltd; New Ed edition, pp50–108
 Jacoby L.L., & Kelley, C.M. (1992). A process-dissociation framework for investigating unconscious influences: Freudian slips, projective tests, subliminal perception and signal detection theory. Current Directions in Psychological Science, 1, 174–179.
 Motley, M.T. (1985). "Slips of the tongue", Scientific American, 253, 116–127
 Smith, D.J. Speech Errors, Speech Production Models, and Speech Pathology, (2003), Online. Internet. https://web.archive.org/web/20071205074434/http://www.smithsrisca.demon.co.uk/speech-errors.html

External links
 Der Mensch determiniert durch unbewusste Motivierung. Erläutert in der Psychopathologie des Alltags von S. Freud. Erläuterte kritische Zusammenfassung der Psychopathologie mit Erläuterung Freud’scher Versprecher (German)
 Freudian Slips. Explains what they are and offers examples of slips approached through psychoanalytic means.

English-language idioms
Speech error
Freudian psychology
Popular psychology
Psychoanalytic terminology